Metak may refer to:

 Metak (band), a Croatian rock band
 Metak (album), a 2006 album by Stoja